Vasudeo Sitaram Bendrey (abbr. Va. Si. Bendre) (13 February 1894 - 16 July 1986) was historian, author, editor, translator and publisher in Marathi language. He is known as Bhishmacharya of Marathi History. He dedicated his work for research in Maharashtra history and wrote, edited and translated over 60 books on different history topics. 

He is well known for searching first known image of Chhatrapati Shivaji Maharaj. Before this image, the look of Chhatrapati Shivaji Maharaj was not known to people.

With research of many years he wrote first full-proof biography of Chhatrapati Sambhaji Maharaj, son of Chhatrapati Shivaji Maharaj and second Chhatrapati of Maratha Empire. This book technically clarified the image of Sambhaji Maharaj. He also searched the actual samādhi of Sambhaji Maharaj which is located in Vadhu Budruk village in Pune District, Maharashtra.

He wrote the book Sadhan Chikitsa in 1928. This book was considered to be his first historical volume because many historians of the time considered it to be a must read book for aspiring historians and researchers of Maratha history.

His other notable work includes the books on Sant Tukaram Maharaj, Chhatrapati Rajaram Maharaj

Early Life 

His early education took place in Pen and he completed his matriculation at Wilson high school in Mumbai. In those days you were required to be 16 years old to take the matriculation exam but Bendrey was very much ready to take this exam when he was 14 years old. For those 2 years he took an unpaid internship at the offices of the Railway audit. During his stint as an unpaid intern he mastered shorthand and stenography in a period of 3 months. His ability to master shorthand in a short period earned him a gold medal. His strive, dedication and work ethic and ability to make decisions was noticed by his superiors who recommended him to become a second level gazetted officer. Mr J.G. Converton who was the director of Education saw a great potential in VS Bendrey and encouraged and supported him in making the research of the history of the Maratha’s as his main career. Among his prominent works was his work on 2 volumes on Chhatrapati Shivaji, one volume on the life of Chhatrapati Sambhaji, and works on the "abhangs" of Sant Tukaram. He retired at the age of  55 to pursue his passion in writing and researching Maratha history.  

He lived for 92 years and spent all the time he had working on his research into the history of Maratha’s. His last work was on Sant Tukaram; he died before the book was published. This task was completed by his son Ravindra Bendrey. He died on 16 July 1986 at his home in Mumbai.

Sadhan Chikitsa 

He started his research and study in Bharat Itihas Sanshodhak Mandal, Pune at very young age. In 1928 he shot into prominence with the publication of his first book called "Sadhan-Chikitsa '' which was published in Pune. This book was considered to be his first historical volume because many historians of the time considered it to be a must read book for aspiring historians and researchers of Maratha history. Sadhan-Chikitsa served as a concise introduction to Maratha history as well as a guide that provided the tools for conducting research in the field. Prof S.A. Dange, a prominent researcher of the time, saw great value in following the principles of research laid out in the book.

Journey to Europe 

In 1938 his work and depth of knowledge in the history of Marathas was recognized by Lord Braybon who recommended that Bendrey be provided a historical research scholarship. This scholarship provided Bendrey the opportunity to go to England and Europe, where he spent all the time he could into studying historical papers that were filed at various research institutions. Since he was dealing with documents and  artifacts that were hundreds of years old, the prime minister of England gave him a special permission that allowed him to go over the material.

Searching first picture of Shivaji Maharaj 

He was often quoted as saying that history could only be written when one had truly examined the proof’s that were provided. This was widely accepted by his colleagues. One such example was that in those days the picture of Chhatrapati Shivaji that was widely accepted was not what we know him to be today. Bendrey was the first to prove that the picture purported to be of Chhatrapati Shivaji was that of Ibrahim Khan and was drawn by an artist called Manuchi. In 1919, Bendrey  was researching the history of Chhatrapati Sambhaji, he came across a book that was written by Mckenzie in it he found a letter written by the Dutch Governor called Valentine who was the Governor of Surat  between 1663-1664. On the occasion when Chhatrapati Shivaji and the Dutch governor met. There was a picture drawn of both of them that was included in the book. However instead of going out and saying he had got a true picture of Chhatrapati Shivaji, he waited till he was able to look at the very letter of Valentine and the accompanying Drawing of Governor Valentine and Chhatrapati Shivaji during his trip to England. He finally released the picture to the public in an event in Pune on Shiv Jayanti in Shivaji Mandir that was arranged by Sahityacharya N. C. Kelkar. This picture and Governor Valentine's letter was published in various newspapers of different languages. The picture of Chhatrapati Shivaji that we know today in our minds is due to the research of historian Bendrey, not only did this research put to rest the question as to how Chhatrapati Shivaji looked but it also gave the Maharashtrian community a sense of identity. He also authored 2 books on Chhatrapati Shivaji that was finally published in 1970.

Work on Chhatrapati Sambhaji Maharaj 

For years it was believed that Chhatrapati Sambhaji’s death and samadhi was located in Tulapur but Bendrey’s research led him to prove that the true location of Sambhaji’s samadhi was in Vadhu Budruk (Near Pune). He went to the location of Chhatrapati Sambhaji’s samadhi and discovered that it was in a state where nature had overrun it. He and his fellow historians cleaned the place to find the “Vrindavan '' of Chhatrapati Sambhaji. Today in the month of March during the new moon (Chhatrapati Sambhaji’s death day) a big celebration is held in Vadhu to commemorate the life of Chhatrapati Sambhaji. In 1999 Chhatrapati Sambhaji’s Biography was republished for the 3rd time and was released in Vadhu.

In 1948 in recognition of VS Bendrey’s achievements the Govt of India nominated him to be the Director of Research at the Peshwa Daftar. At the Peshwa Daftar VS Bendrey took on the complicated task of Cataloging by subject and period of nearly 4 Cr historical documents written Modi Script. He developed the methodology for cataloging as well as wrote a book on how to create a one line catalog called “ Alienation Office Records and Poona Daftar (Pub 1950)” that would help others to carry on the cataloging process, this book is still in use today by researchers and catalogers. Further his book called “Report on the Peshwa Daftar or guide to the records” has also proved to be useful to researchers.

The Daftar in Thanjavur was also in a bad shape, the then chief minister of Tamil Nadu Shri Rajgopalachari having heard of VS Bendrey’s knowledge and success at the Pune Daftar asked Shri VS Bendrey to help catalog the disarray of historical documents at the Thanjavur Daftar in 1950. He was successful at this task and was recognized by Shri Rajgopalchari.

In 1963 he joined the Mumbai Itihas mandal as Director at the same time he served as the CEO of the Maharashtra Aitihasik Parishad. Between 1966-68 he was responsible for organizing 3 conventions, in his 5 year term he was responsible for the publication of 14 books and 19 publications of the quarterly journal called “Itihas ani Sanskruti”. Further for the professor community he conducted classes on how to conduct historical research and writing. He also went to universities such as Pune, Mumbai, Kolhapur,Marathwada and Nagpur to conduct conventions on Maratha history. He also played an advisory role in the Indian historical records commission and the All India history Congress. He was also awarded recognition awards for the biographies of Maloji- Shahaji, Sambhaji, Shivaji and Rajaram.

Between 1926-75 he wrote more than 60 books in Marathi and English. He was not only an accomplished historian but also an avid writer and storyteller. His first book “Stenography for India” was published in 1926 and his last book before his death was “Rajaram” in 1975. All his life VS Bendrey was very much interested in the life and compositions of Sant Tukaram for 30 to 35 years  he wrote and published 8 to 9 books on Sant Tukaram, in his final years he was in the process of completing “Tukaram Gatha” the only thing that was left was the writing of chapters of Introduction when he died.  After his death his son Ravindra Bendrey completed the Introduction in 2003 and published the  book called “Tukaramache aparakashit abhang”

VS Bendrey in his lifetime also took on social issues in Indian life and took an active role in the anti-dowry movement  and tried to make people aware of how a hindu marriage was to be conducted in the true historical ways which did not involve the taking of Dowry. He was also involved in the Brotherhood Scout movement and Vidyarthi Sanghatana. His books are available for one and all to read in various libraries in the world.

He was known as Dada to everyone, being a very family oriented person he managed to take care of his family needs while undertaking research projects in the history of Maharashtra. He married kamla bai parkar who hailed from baroda. He had a large family  of 4 sons and 7 daughters. He was very well supported by his wife in all his endeavours. He also had a lot of friends, some of his friends were  Sahitya Samrat N.C. Kelkar, Com Dange, Prabhodankar Thakre, CD Deshmukh, N.R. Phatak, Historian D. V. Potdar, Karmaveer Bhaurav Patil, Chief Minister Yashwantrao Chavan, Justice Ranade, V.S. Khare, VK Rajwade, Historian Shejwalkar, Historian Setu Madhav Pagdi,Prime Minister Pandit Jawarlal Nehru also expressed his respect for the accomplishments of V.S. Bendrey. Rajgopalacharya the chief  minister of Madras had also appreciated the work of VS Bendrey

List of Publications  

Shivshahi period
1. Maloji Raje and Shahaji Maharaj: p. 636,
2. Eldest brother of Shivaji Maharaj - Sambhaji Raje Bhosale: p. 64
3. Maharashtra of the Shivashahi Period: Pp. 36.
4-5. Shrichatrapati Shivaji Maharaj - Eastern and Northern India - Volume 2, p. 1250
6. Rana Jaisingh and Shivaji Maharaj: p. 250
7. Coronation of Shivaji the Great: Pp. 140
8. Srishivarajabhishek (Gagabhat): p. 125
9. Srichatrapati Sambhaji Maharaj: p. 750, first edition
10. Srichatrapati Sambhaji Maharaj: p. 596, 2nd ed.
11. Dandanitiprakaranam (Keshav Pandit): p. 140
12. Rajaramcharitam (Keshav Pandit): p. 120
13. Rajaramcharitam (Keshav Pandit - Original Sanskrit only): p. 32
14. Srichhatrapati Rajaram and 'Leaderless Hindavi Swarajya' fight with Mughals: p. 572
15. Instrumental Medicine (Introductory Volume of the History of Shivshahi): p. 350
16. Research History and Resources of Maharashtra History: p. 84
17. History revision method, author K. P. Pandit, Second Edition, Editor V.S.Bendre.

Other historical:
18. Tarikh-I-Ilahi or Akbar’s Divine Era: Pp. 50
19. Adilshahi of Bijapur: Adamase p. 700
20. Qutubshahi of Govalkonda: p. 364
21. A Study of Muslim Inscriptions: Pp. 200
22. Movements of Portuguese in Maharashtra: p. 129
23. Downfall of Angre’s Navy: Pp. 43.

Historical texts:
24. Tools of Maharashtra History - Section 1: Published in old periodicals. P. 192
25. Tools of Maharashtra History-Section 2nd: p. 592
26. Tools of Maharashtra History - Section 3rd: p. 614
27. The Factory and Company Records - Report: Pp. 16
28. Alienation Office Records and Poona Daftar: Pp. 80
29. Report on the Peshava Daftar or Guide to the Records:
30. A Study of Literature on Science and Technology of Olden Times: Pp. 24
31. Maharashtra History Council - Essay Collection: First Session: p. 200.
32. Maharashtra History Council - Collection of Essays: Convention II: p. 175
33. Maharashtra History Council - Convention III: p. 350
34. Maharashtra History Council - Convention IV: p. 300.

Saint Tukaram:
35. Saint-narrator of Tukaram Maharaj: p. 250
36, Raghav Chaitanya, Keshav Chaitanya and Babaji or Tukob's Guru Parampara: p. 260,
37. Saint Tukaram: p. 250
38. Mantra Gita by Sreesanth Shrestha Tukaram Maharaj: with character and medical prologue, p. 350
39. Mantra Gita by Sreesanth Shrestha Tukaram Maharaj: Second Edition, p. 260
40. Dehudarshan: p. 60
41. Dehudarshan Chitrasangraha: p. 16

Saints:
42. Sheikh Mohammad Baba Shrigondekar's "Yoga Sangram": p. 250
43. Unpublished collection of poems by Sheikh Mohammad Baba Shrigondekar: p. 225
44. Krishnadas Vairagikrit ‘Chatu Shloki Bhagavatavali Nirupane’ 64
45. Navvidhabhakti or Bhaktitattvadarsha-Shivachaitanyakrit: p. 200.

Others
46. Sighradhvanilekhanapaddati - Marathi: p. 100
47. : Quick Voice Writing System - Gujarati: p. 100
48. Stenography for India: Pp. 54
49. Gad Kot Durg: p. 100
50-53. Tukaram Maharaj's comprehensive collection of poems: Part 1 to 4.
54. Sreesanth Shrestha Tukaram Maharaj: (Tukaram Maharaj Character-Part 1), Adamase p. 250.
55. Sreesanth Shrestha Tukaram Maharaj's philosophy and teachings of Paraviya: Adamase p. 250.
56. Tukaram - His Life, Writing and Philosophy: about 300 Pages.
57. Indian History and Culture: Quarterly-17 100 pages each

Gallery

Notes

References 
 Puri, Ketan Kailas (2021). "Marhata Patshah", New Era Publishing House, 17 (141).
 Bendrey, V. S. (2022). "Sadhan Chikitsa", Prakrut Prakashan, p.316

1894 births
Marathi people
Marathi-language writers
20th-century Indian historians
Indian historians
Indian translators
Indian writers
People from Pune
People from Mumbai
1986 deaths